Killanena, also known as Killanena and Flagmount, is a parish in County Clare and part of the Inis Cealtra grouping of parishes within the Roman Catholic Diocese of Killaloe.

Current (2022) co-parish priest is Joe McMahon.

Originally, Killanena was part of the large parish of Feakle. I was temporary split off in 1839. In 1842 this became permanent.

Churches
Shortly after his appointment as first priest of the parish, Fr. William Moloney started with upgrading the places of worship in his parish. He replaced the old chapels in Killanena and Flagmount by new churches, both named St. Mary's Church.

Notable People
 Joseph Rodgers - bishop of Killaloe 1955-1966

References

Parishes of the Roman Catholic Diocese of Killaloe